Philippe Alexandre Autexier (1954–1998) was a French music historian, musicologist, journalist and Masonic researcher, whose research on Wolfgang Amadeus Mozart and other Masonic composers is particularly significant.

Biography 
Autexier was passionate about music, his research led him to become a musicologist and music historian, a speaker who expressed in French, English, German and Italian. He has taught at several conservatories and universities in France, Italy, Germany, United Kingdom and the United States. He has written music reviews for various specialised journals, and a number of books on Mozart, Liszt, Bartók and other Freemason musicians. He was director of the “” (Mozart and Freemason) exhibition in 1991 in Cahors. He has also participated in many radio programmes, such as France Musique, France Culture, BBC Radio, as well as German and Swiss channels.

During more than 20 years, he worked on the subject of “” (Column of Harmony)—a research on the Masonic music history—which led him to study all the collections of Masonic archives in Europe (Paris, Strasbourg, Zürich, Vienna, Bayreuth, Berlin, Poznań, The Hague, et cetera). The research results have been published in his book .

It is simple, concise and accessible to all, unlike the rest of his books which are elitist works.

Bibliography 
 Béla Bartók : Musique de la vie, Stock Musique, 1981
 Les oeuvres témoins de Mozart, Éditions A. Leduc, 1982
 Mozart & Liszt sub Rosa, Centre Mozart, 1984
 Mozart, Honoré Champion, 1987
 Don Giovanni : Horizons mozartiens, Philippe Olivier, 1990
 Beethoven : La force de l’absolu, collection « Découvertes Gallimard » (nº 106), série Arts. Éditions Gallimard, 1991, new edition in 2010
 Beethoven: The Composer as Hero, “Abrams Discoveries” series. Harry N. Abrams, 1992. (U.S. edition)
 Beethoven: The Composer as Hero, ‘New Horizons’ series, Thames & Hudson, 1992. (UK edition)
 La Lyre Maçonne : Mozart, Haydn, Spohr, Liszt, Éditions Detrad aVs, 1991
 La Colonne d’Harmonie : Histoire, Théorie, Pratique, Éditions Detrad aVs, 1991, new edition in 2013
 L’art de la planche : Théorie et pratique du morceau d’architecture et de la communication en loge, Éditions Detrad aVs, 1996, new edition in 2005

References 

1954 births
1998 deaths
Music historians
20th-century French musicologists
20th-century French writers
20th-century French historians
1998 suicides
Suicides in France